North Carolina's 41st Senate district is one of 50 districts in the North Carolina Senate. It has been represented by Democrat Natasha Marcus since 2019.

Geography
Since 2013, the district has covered part of Mecklenburg County. The district overlaps with the 88th, 98th, 101st, 106th, and 107th state house districts.

District officeholders since 1993

Election results

2022

2020

2018

2016

2014

2012

2010

2008

2006

2004

2002

2000

References

North Carolina Senate districts
Mecklenburg County, North Carolina